Ladyhawke is a 1985 medieval fantasy film directed and produced by Richard Donner and starring Matthew Broderick, Rutger Hauer and Michelle Pfeiffer. The story is about a young thief who becomes unwillingly involved with a warrior and his lady who are hunted by the Bishop of Aquila. As he learns about the couple's past and secret, he chooses to help them overcome the bishop's forces, and to lift an infernal curse.

Plot

In medieval Italy, Phillipe Gaston, a thief known as "The Mouse", is imprisoned in the dungeons of the evil Bishop of Aquila. Phillipe escapes, just in time to avoid execution. He is recaptured at an inn by the Bishop's guards, led by Captain Marquet. The former captain, Etienne Navarre, arrives, rescues him, and defeats Marquet and the guards. As Navarre and Phillipe flee on horseback, Navarre's hawk scatters the other guards, aiding the escape.

Navarre and Phillipe stay the night at a farmer's barn. Later, Phillipe tries to leave, but the farmer attempts to kill him. An enormous black wolf protects him by killing the farmer. Phillipe looks for Navarre in the barn, but discovers a beautiful young woman, dressed in Navarre's cloak, who walks away with the wolf.

In the morning, Navarre returns, reveals his intention to kill the Bishop, and asks Phillipe to help him get inside Aquila. Phillipe refuses, and Navarre ties him to a tree. That night, Phillippe meets the woman again and tricks her into cutting his bonds. The next day, he is captured by the Bishop's guards, who use him to set up an ambush for Navarre. During the ambush, Navarre and his hawk are each hit by a crossbow bolt, but Navarre manages to defeat the Bishop's guards and save Phillipe.

Navarre orders Phillipe to take the hawk, who is the worse injured of the two of them, and ride ahead to the ruined castle of a monk named Imperius for help. The hawk is sequestered in a room, but a curious Phillipe picks the lock and finds the mysterious woman inside, her chest struck with the bolt. After tending to her wound, Imperius explains that she is Isabeau of Anjou, who had once refused the Bishop's unwelcome advances. After a drunken Imperius leaked the fact that Navarre and Isabeau had secretly wed, the enraged Bishop put the couple under a satanic curse. Isabeau becomes a hawk by day and Navarre a wolf by night; despite being always together, they are eternally apart. Just before dawn, Imperius' castle is invaded by the Bishop's soldiers; while escaping, Isabeau falls off a tower, but Phillipe is able to hold onto her for a moment, letting her go just as the sunrise turns her into a hawk so she can fly away.

When Navarre catches up, Imperius tells him that the curse can be broken if the couple faces the Bishop, both as humans, on "a day without a night and a night without a day". Navarre dismisses Imperius as an old drunk, and continues on his way to Aquila, intent on simply killing the Bishop for revenge. Now invested in the lovers' story, Phillipe volunteers to accompany them. After the group's perilous encounters with a wolf-trapper and a frozen river, Phillipe saves Navarre's life, earns his friendship, and convinces him to try to break the curse before killing the Bishop.

At night, Imperius and Isabeau smuggle the Navarre-wolf into Aquila, while Phillipe swims back through the sewers to get inside the cathedral. Seeing no divine sign on the day that he and Isabeau are to appear as humans together, Navarre reverts to his original plan to kill the Bishop. He orders Imperius to euthanize the hawk should the cathedral bells ring, which would mean he had failed.

Phillipe infiltrates the cathedral and unlocks its doors. Navarre rides in and duels with Marquet. Suddenly noticing a solar eclipse through a window, Navarre realises Imperius was right. He tries to get back to Imperius, but fails to keep the guards from ringing the bell. Believing that Imperius has killed Isabeau, Navarre continues his fight and eventually kills Marquet.

As Navarre is about to execute the unarmed Bishop, a human Isabeau enters the cathedral and stops him. Together, she and Navarre face the Bishop and break the curse. The maddened Bishop tries to kill Isabeau, only to die by Navarre's sword. Isabeau and Navarre finally embrace in joy.

Cast
 Matthew Broderick as Phillipe Gaston, a young thief known as "The Mouse".
 Rutger Hauer as Etienne of Navarre, the former Captain of the Guard of Aquila, who is hunted by the Bishop.
 Akeela, Kollchek, Levi, and Sasha—a quartet of melanistic Siberian wolves—as Etienne's lupine form.
 Michelle Pfeiffer as Isabeau of Anjou, the Comte d'Anjou's daughter, who is hunted by the Bishop.
 Gift (c.1979–2 or 3 Dec 2014) and Ladyhawke (d. May 2007) (named Spike II until 2000)—two female red-tailed hawks—as Isabeau's avian form.
 Leo McKern as Imperius, an old monk living in a ruined castle who used to serve the Bishop.
 John Wood as the Bishop of Aquila, who is obsessed with killing Etienne and capturing Isabeau.
 Ken Hutchison as Captain Marquet, the current Captain of the Guard.
 Alfred Molina as Cezar, a wolf trapper who serves the Bishop.
 Giancarlo Prete as Fornac, a guard officer.
 Loris Loddi as Jehan, a guard officer.

Production

Richard Donner had attempted to get the film financed for a number of years and came close to making it twice, once in England and once in Czechoslovakia. He eventually got the project up at Warners and Fox, where it was green-lit by Alan Ladd Jr. Originally, Kurt Russell was cast as the male lead alongside Michelle Pfeiffer. The role of the pickpocket was offered to Sean Penn and then Dustin Hoffman, before Donner decided to go with Matthew Broderick. Eventually, Russell pulled out during rehearsals, and Rutger Hauer was chosen to replace him.

Filming locations
 
Ladyhawke was filmed in Italy; the Apennine meadow of Campo Imperatore in Abruzzo served as a prominent exterior location, while the monk scene was filmed at Rocca Calascio, a ruined fortress on top of a mountain, not far from real-world L'Aquila. In the region of Emilia-Romagna, the town of Castell'Arquato in the province of Piacenza and castle of Torrechiara in the province of Parma were also featured. Other Italian locations used include Soncino in the Lombardia region, Belluno in the Veneto region, and the Lazio region around Viterbo.

Soundtrack

Andrew Powell composed the score, and it was produced by Alan Parsons. Richard Donner stated that he was listening to The Alan Parsons Project (on which Powell collaborated) while scouting for locations, and became unable to separate his visual ideas from the music. Powell combined traditional orchestral music and Gregorian chants with contemporary progressive rock-infused material. At the time, it was part of a trend among 1980s fantasy films of abandoning the lush orchestral scores of composers such as  John Williams, James Horner, and Jerry Goldsmith in favor of a modern pop/rock sound.  The soundtrack album was released in 1985 and re-released with additional tracks in 1995. On February 10, 2015, a 2-disc set was released by La-La Land Records; it include previously unreleased music and bonus tracks and was limited to 3,000 units.

Reception

Box office
The film was a box-office disappointment, grossing around $18.4 million against a $20 million budget and ranking 48th for the year at the North American box office.

Critical response
Ladyhawke has a rating of 65% on Rotten Tomatoes, based on 26 critics' reviews. The site's consensus states: "There's pacing problems, but Ladyhawke has an undeniable romantic sweep that's stronger than most fantasy epics of its ilk."

Vincent Canby in The New York Times called the film "divided against itself," and went on to say that "scenes of high adventure or of visual splendor... are spliced between other scenes with dialogue of a banality that recalls the famous Tony Curtis line, 'Yondah lies my faddah's castle. Time Out called it "all rather facile sword-and-sorcery stuff, of course, but at times very funny... and always beautifully photographed." Variety described the film as a "very likeable, very well-made fairytale... worthwhile for its extremely authentic look alone." Siskel & Ebert both gave the film positive "thumbs up" reviews on their syndicated television show and thought Ladyhawke was beautifully filmed with the potential to achieve lasting success as a classic in its genre. Siskel's only major complaint was that Broderick's role was almost anachronistic in his 1980s-style jokes, while Ebert felt Broderick's comedic elements were fitting.

The New York Times singled out Matthew Broderick's skill in coming "very close to transforming contemporary wisecracks – particularly, his asides to God – into a more ageless kind of comedy," and said of Michelle Pfeiffer that her "presence, both ethereal and erotic, is so vivid that even when she's represented as a hawk, she still seems to be on the screen." Variety praised the casting of the lead actors, considering Pfeiffer "perfect as the enchanting beauty." Time Out called Rutger Hauer "camp" and Pfeiffer "decorative."

Colin Greenland reviewed Ladyhawke for Imagine magazine, and stated that "a singular tale of witchcraft, love and courage, with a fascinating idea that it almost makes the most of."

Accolades

Ladyhawke was nominated for two Academy Awards, in the categories of Best Sound (Les Fresholtz, Dick Alexander, Vern Poore and Bud Alper) and Best Sound Effects Editing (Bob Henderson and Alan Murray), winning neither. It won a Saturn Award for Best Fantasy Film, and was nominated in the categories of Best Actress (Michelle Pfeiffer) and Best Music (Andrew Powell).

See also
 List of films featuring eclipses

References

External links

 
 Ladyhawke at Movie Review Query Engine
 
 
 

1985 films
1985 drama films
American romantic fantasy films
British fantasy films
Italian fantasy films
1980s English-language films
1985 fantasy films
Films about shapeshifting
Films with screenplays by David Peoples
Films with screenplays by Tom Mankiewicz
Films directed by Richard Donner
Films set in castles
Films set in the 13th century
Films set in Italy
Films shot in Abruzzo
Films about birds
American werewolf films
1985 soundtrack albums
Fantasy film soundtracks
Warner Bros. films
20th Century Fox films
1980s American films
1980s British films
1980s Italian films
1980s fantasy adventure films